Tjautjas (sometimes called Čavččas or Tjautjasjaure) is a locality situated in Gällivare Municipality, Norrbotten County, Sweden with 234 inhabitants in 2010.

Tjautjas is located 20 kilometers north-east of Koskullskulle and can only be reached through that village.

Tjautjas hosts an annual festival each year in August called Flottkalaset, a music and cultural event featuring folk musicians from all over Sweden along with other types of performers such as acrobats, jugglers, and clowns.

References 

Populated places in Gällivare Municipality
Lapland (Sweden)
Populated places in Arctic Sweden